Aleksei Borisovich Rodionov (born April 26, 1947) is a Russian cinematographer.

Filmography
 Farewell (1983)
 Among Grey Stones (1983)
 Come and See (1985)
 Orlando (1992)
 A Moslem (1995)
 Passion in the Desert (1998)
 Talk of Angels (1998)
 Cinderella (2000)
 Eisenstein (2000)
 Where Eskimos Live (2002)
 Yes (2004)
 Admiral (2008)
 Generation P (2008)
 The Party (2017)

Awards
 1990, nominated for Best Cinematographer at Nika Award (Zhena kerosinshchika)
 1996, nominated for Best Cinematographer at Nika Award (A Moslem)
 2009, won Golden Eagle Award (Admiral, shared with Igor Grinyakin)

References

External links

Aleksei Rodionov at the Internet Encyclopedia of Cinematographers

1947 births
Russian cinematographers
Living people
Mass media people from Moscow